Trubovshchina is a rural locality (a village) in Yenangskoye Rural Settlement, Kichmengsko-Gorodetsky District, Vologda Oblast, Russia. The population was 13 as of 2002.

Geography 
Trubovshchina is located 72 km southeast of Kichmengsky Gorodok (the district's administrative centre) by road. Stepurino is the nearest rural locality.

References 

Rural localities in Kichmengsko-Gorodetsky District